Lag, or similar, may refer to:

Lag
 Łąg, Poland
 Lag (company), a French guitar maker
 Lag (cue sports), a brief pre-game competition to determine which player will go first
 Latency (engineering), a slower response time in computing, communications, and engineering
 Lag (video games), a slower response time in video gaming
 Lag screw or lag bolt
 Jet lag
 Turbo lag
 A very long putt in golf
 British slang for inmate in a prison (usually "old lag")
 The time between tasks in project plans; see 
 The time before a medical diagnosis
 A measure for spatial dependence in a sampling variogram
 A delay of payment to take advantage of an expected change in exchange rates; see Leads and lags

LAG
 LAG Motorcoach, a Belgian bus and trailer manufacturer
 La Grange Road station (Amtrak station code: LAG)
 Lancaster Gate tube station (London Underground station code: LAG)
 Latin America Solidarity Organisation in Norway (Latin-Amerika gruppene i Norge)
 Ligue d'Athlétisme de la Guyane, the governing body for the sport of athletics in French Guiana
 Lines of arrested growth, also known as Harris lines
 Link aggregation group, multiple computer network cables/ports used in parallel
 Local action group, a community-based organization used by groups like LEADER programme and OneVirginia2021
 Lokalbahn AG, a former German private railway company

LAGS
 Lindisfarne Anglican Grammar School
 Linguistic Atlas of the Gulf States

See also 
 
 Lagg (disambiguation)
 Lagging (disambiguation)